Spondylus americanus, the Atlantic thorny oyster, is a species of bivalve mollusc. It can be found along the Atlantic coast of North America, ranging from North Carolina to Brazil.

Description
When growing in a crevice, the shape of the shell adapts itself to the available space. The color varies but is usually white or cream with orange or purplish areas making it well camouflaged to hide from its predators. The lower valve is flat and is attached to the substrate. When the living animal is lying on the seabed it is usually not visible because of the algae, marine animals and sediment that cover the shell. The flat tree oyster and Lister's tree oyster are often among these epibionts. A diver swimming past may just observe a slight movement on the seabed as the oyster snaps its valves shut. Young animals are much less spiny than adults and resemble members of the genus Chama, the jewelbox clams.

Distribution and habitat
Its range extends from North Carolina and Texas southwards to Venezuela and Brazil. It occurs on deep water reefs especially in areas with high sedimentation. It is often lodged in a crevice or concealed under an overhang. It is also a member of the fouling community, being found on sea walls, man made structures and wrecks.

Biology
The Atlantic thorny oyster is a filter feeder sifting out plankton and other organic material from the water that passes over its gills. Little is known of its breeding habits but the larvae are planktonic, seeking out suitable locations on which to settle. Areas with suitable calcareous matter for building the shell are favoured. The adults are sedentary and normally occupy the same position for the rest of their lives unless shifted by storms.

References

External links
 

Spondylidae
Molluscs described in 1781